The 1966 All-Eastern football team consists of American football players chosen by various selectors as the best players at each position among the Eastern colleges and universities during the 1966 NCAA University Division football season.

Offense

Quarterback
 Mickey Beard, Dartmouth (AP-1)

Halfbacks
 Floyd Little, Syracuse (AP-1)
 Bobby Leo, Harvard (AP-1)

Fullback
 Larry Csonka, Syracuse (AP-1)

Ends
 Rob Taylor, Navy (AP-1)
 Jack Emmer, Rutgers (AP-1)

Tackles
 Gary Bugenhagen, Syracuse (AP-1)
 Steve Diamond, Harvard (AP-1)

Guards
 Bob Hyland, Boston College (AP-1)
 Bill Benecick, Syracuse (AP-1)

Center
 Chuck Matuszak, Dartmouth (AP-1)

Defense

Ends
 Bill Dow, Navy (AP-1)
 Herb Stacker, Syracuse (AP-1)

Tackles
 Bob Greenlee, Yale (AP-1)
 Roy Norton, Boston University (AP-1)

Middle guard
 Mike Reid, Penn State (AP-1)

Linebackers
 Townsend Clarke, Army (AP-1)
 Jim Flanigan, Pittsburgh (AP-1)
 Ray Ila, Colgate (AP-1)

Backs   
 Tom Wilson, Colgate (AP-1)
 Wynn Mabry, Dartmouth (AP-1)
 Don Dietz, Army (AP-1)

Key
 AP = Associated Press
 UPI = United Press International

See also
 1966 College Football All-America Team

References

All-Eastern
All-Eastern college football teams